The Grammy Award for Best Mexican/Mexican-American Album was an award presented to recording artists for quality albums in the Mexican music genre at the Grammy Awards, a ceremony that was established in 1958 and originally called the Gramophone Awards. Honors in several categories are presented at the ceremony annually by the National Academy of Recording Arts and Sciences of the United States to "honor artistic achievement, technical proficiency and overall excellence in the recording industry, without regard to album sales or chart position".

Since its inception, the award category has had several name changes. From 1984 to 1991 the award was known as Best Mexican-American Performance. From 1992 to 1994 it was awarded as Best Mexican-American Album. In 1995 it returned to the title Best Mexican-American Performance. From 1996 to 1998 it was awarded as Best Mexican-American/Tejano Music Performance. In 1999, the category name was changed to Best Mexican-American Music Performance, and in 2000 it returned to the title Best Mexican-American Performance once again. From 2001 to 2008 the award was presented as Best Mexican/Mexican-American Album. In 2009, the category was split into two new fields: Best Norteño Album and Best Regional Mexican Album.

Mexican-American artist Flaco Jiménez is the most-awarded performer in the category with four wins, twice as a solo performer and twice as member of Texas Tornados and Los Super Seven. He is followed by fellow Mexican-American performer Pepe Aguilar with three winning albums and by American singers Vikki Carr and Linda Ronstadt, Mexican singers Luis Miguel and Joan Sebastian, and bands La Mafia and Los Lobos, with two wins each. Mexican ranchera performer Vicente Fernández was the most nominated artist without a win with ten unsuccessful nominations.

Recipients

See also

 Grammy Award for Best Banda Album
 Grammy Award for Best Regional Mexican Music Album (including Tejano)
 Grammy Award for Best Tejano Album
 List of Grammy Award categories
 Regional styles of Mexican music

References

 
1984 establishments in the United States
2008 disestablishments in the United States
Awards established in 1984
Awards disestablished in 2008
Mexican-American Album
Mexican Mexican-American Album
Mexican Mexican-American Album
Mexican-American culture
Album awards